Orenco is a light rail station in Hillsboro, Oregon, United States, served by TriMet as part of the MAX Light Rail system. The two-track, island platform station serves the Orenco Station neighborhood, which is considered a model for smart growth and transit-oriented development. It features a 125-space park and ride, a bike and ride, and connections to TriMet bus route 47–Baseline/Evergreen and Ride Connection's North Hillsboro Link.

An Oregon Electric Railway (OE) depot of the same name served the area in the early 20th century. The TriMet station was built as part of the Westside MAX project, which extended MAX from downtown Portland to downtown Hillsboro in 1998. In 2017, TriMet simplified the station's name from "Orenco/Northwest 231st Avenue" after the city renamed Northwest 231st Avenue to Northeast Century Boulevard.

History

Historic Orenco was a community established in 1906 by the Oregon Nursery Company, which is the origin of the portmanteau name "Orenco". The nursery had purchased  of land and moved its operations to the area from Salem. In 1908, the company persuaded OE to include Orenco in its planned Portland–Forest Grove branch line; OE subsequently laid tracks through the town instead of a more southerly route and built a train depot just east of where the present-day light rail station would be located. By the time Orenco incorporated in 1913, OE's Orenco depot had averaged 1,000 passengers per month. The outbreak of World War I in 1914 disrupted the nursery's plans to expand into Europe and resulted in years of financial hardship. The company eventually filed for bankruptcy and closed in 1927. In 1932, OE's Forest Grove line ceased operating due to the Great Depression and competition from automobiles. With the loss of the town's largest employer, residents moved elsewhere. The remaining residents dissolved the local government in 1938.

The former town and its vicinity remained rural for decades after and even became a site for illegal dumping. In the 1950s, much of the area was divided and sold to development ventures, many of which failed. In 1983, the Hillsboro city government initiated annexation plans and consolidated land ownership with the creation of an urban renewal district. Land was later sold to Intel and Pacific Realty Associates, the latter of which would eventually develop the transit-oriented, mixed-use community of Orenco Station.

Planning for an extension of the Metropolitan Area Express (MAX) west from Portland to Hillsboro emerged in 1979 with initial plans terminating the route at 185th Avenue, east of and thus excluding the old Orenco townsite. Staunch lobbying from Hillsboro Mayor Shirley Huffman and others helped to extend the line  farther west through Orenco to downtown Hillsboro in July 1993. The cost of the Hillsboro extension, estimated at $224 million, required approval for an additional $75 million of federal funding, granted in 1994. TriMet, the regional transit agency, began construction of the Westside MAX in August 1993. Track work between 12th Avenue and 185th Avenue in Hillsboro, the segment that included Orenco, commenced in April 1996. The Westside MAX had been scheduled to open from Portland to 185th Avenue in 1997, and to Hillsboro in 1998, but delays during the construction of the Robertson Tunnel pushed most of its opening back by one year. The station opened as Orenco/Northwest 231st Avenue on September 12, 1998.

In September 2017, the station was renamed from "Orenco/Northwest 231st Avenue" to simply "Orenco", in connection with street-name changes approved by the Hillsboro City Council in October 2016. The changes included the renaming of Northwest 231st Avenue within Hillsboro to Northeast Century Boulevard.

Impact on transit-oriented development

During the light rail station's early planning stages, the City of Hillsboro and TriMet imposed high-density development restrictions, despite the opposition of existing residents. In April 1994, Hillsboro approved an interim ordinance that detailed planning standards for the area within  of the station and set a population density goal of 45 residents per . The Orenco Neighborhood Association challenged the ordinance in the Oregon Court of Appeals; the court ruled in favor of the city in July 1995. Two months later, a compromise was reached to allow granny-flat homes to be included in the zoning plans, lowering the initial density target to 34.5 residents per acre.

Pacific Reality Associates, which acquired  of land near the station, developed much of the Orenco Station neighborhood. In the late 1990s, the developer built 450 homes on lots averaging , about twenty percent smaller than a typical lot at the time, with floor plans that averaged ; 1,400 apartments; retail stores; and offices.

The area immediately north of the station, among the last parcels of land to be filled, was approved for development in 2013. The first of the three buildings, called "The Hub", was completed in February 2015. At the district's center is Plaza Park, a  urban plaza that consists of a water feature, a colorful pergola, and a raised deck built around two white oak trees. The plaza is designed to host outdoor public events.

Station details

Located south of Northeast Cornell Road on Northeast Orenco Station Loop and west of Northeast Century Boulevard, the station serves the Orenco Station neighborhood. It was within TriMet's fare zone 3 until the agency discontinued all use of fare zones in 2012. Designed by OTAK Inc., it features an island platform between the two tracks that consists of a shelter, ticket vending machines, and a passenger information display. The station includes a 24-hour park and ride with 125 spaces, as well as a nearby 50-space bike-and-ride facility operated by BikeLink. Between the station and Northeast Cherry Drive is Plaza Park, a public plaza bounded by mid-rise, mixed-use buildings that collectively make up the Platform District.

Public art

Artwork at the station follows two themes: the history of Orenco and a celebration of trees. The artwork incorporates a grove of trees adjacent to the station that was preserved at the behest of the artists in charge of the artwork for the stop. Individual works of art include Rings of Memory Plaza, which consists of concentric circles of granite inscribed with text by Oregon Poet Laureate Kim Stafford. Another piece is a gravel path with stone seat walls leading to an old oak grove entitled Witness Tree Rest, which includes another line by Stafford inscribed on the granite threshold at the east end of the path. Grafted Path, a pathway that connects the station to Northeast Century Boulevard, illustrates the grafting method that distinguished Oregon Nursery Company trees. East of the station is Grove of Perspective, rows of trees that create optical effects when viewed from the moving train.

On the platform is a piece entitled Branch Benches, located in the passenger shelters, which are custom-made benches designed by Nancy Merritt and bracketed by wisteria-covered arbors. On top of the systems building sits a hand-forged sculpture of a tree, designed by Stuart Keeler and Michael Machnic. This weather vane spreads its roots and rises up through a nine-square grid that represents the city plan of Orenco.

Services

Trains serve the station for approximately 22 hours per day on weekdays, 21½ hours on Saturdays, and 19½ hours on Sundays. The headway between trains measures from as little as five minutes during weekday rush hour to 30 minutes in the early mornings and late evenings; the majority of trains run every 15 minutes. From Orenco station, trains take thirteen minutes to reach Hatfield Government Center station in Hillsboro, 39 minutes to reach the Pioneer Square stations in downtown Portland, and 92 minutes to reach Cleveland Avenue station in Gresham. It recorded 1,297 average weekday boardings in fall 2018.

The station connects to TriMet bus route 47–Main/Evergreen, which runs on weekdays to Hillsboro Central Transit Center and the Rock Creek campus of Portland Community College. Additionally, Ride Connection's North Hillsboro Link offers a free weekday bus service between the station and employment areas in North Hillsboro, while Intel operates a shuttle bus to transport employees to and from its nearby Ronler Acres campus.

Former bus service
The station was originally served by a TriMet bus route designated 42s–Orenco ("s" for shuttle), in addition to route 47, introduced with the station's opening in 1998. Route 42s was eliminated as a separate route in December 2001, when it was combined with route 47 but with a section along Orenco Station Parkway and Butler Road discontinued without replacement.

References

External links

1998 establishments in Oregon
Bus stations in Oregon
MAX Blue Line
MAX Light Rail stations
Railway stations in the United States opened in 1998
Railway stations in Washington County, Oregon
Transportation in Hillsboro, Oregon